Vertigo Days is the ninth studio album by German electronic band The Notwist. It was released on 29 January 2021 by Morr Music.

Release
On 31 July 2020, the Notwist's released the first single "Ship". The single features Japanese musician Saya Uenon of Tenniscoats.

The second single "Oh Sweet Fire" was released on 9 October 2020. Jazz musician Ben LaMar Gay features on the single.

Critical reception
Vertigo Days was met with "generally favorable" reviews from critics. At Metacritic, which assigns a weighted average rating out of 100 to reviews from mainstream publications, this release received an average score of 75 based on 10 reviews. AnyDecentMusic? gave the release a 7.1 out of 10 based on 9 reviews.

Writing for AllMusic, Heather Phares said: "Vertigo Days''' ranginess suits the Notwist; after all, they've always resisted easy categorization, and they've rarely sounded as loose and spontaneous as they do here. The album's scope is so big that its smaller moments could get lost in the shuffle, but its details are just as memorable as its broad strokes." Tim Sentz of Beats Per Minute wrote: "While Vertigo Days boasts a heap of guest musicians, none ever outshine The Notwist, something that can often happen on guest-heavy albums. Instead, this cast of characters from around the world does wonders for their sound and makes for an intriguing and rewarding listen every time." At Exclaim!, Eric Hill gave the release a 7-out-of=10, while noting "Vertigo Days has a familiar but notably updated and refined palette of sounds. Micha charts a course in sound that touches on everything from light chamber baroque to hints of Tropicália in fresh new combinations. Markus, as always, finds the pockets to insert gentle, hook-laden guitar melodies and fragile-voiced lyrics. The ambitions, expansions, and collaborations on Vertigo Days mostly pay off, sacrificing a little thematic cohesion for the reward of greater variety in sound." PopMatters said: "The 14 tracks on Vertigo Days function as nuggets of noise. There are rhythms and drops, meaningful pauses and blather, atmospherics that drift into nothingness, and abrasive sonics. Listening can be a trip maybe one doesn't want to take except as an escape from reality."

In a review for Under the Radar'', the album was described: "While past releases included more concrete pop melodies, the songs here are decidedly more abstract and moodier, with woozy orchestrations that reach back in time to remind us of the jazz-rock explorations of Soft Machine and Krautrock pioneers Can. Most tracks feel more like conceptual musical ideas rather than fully formed songs with clever arrangements, peculiar horns, and a rhythmic interplay of motley instrumentation."

Commercial performance
On 5 February 2021, the album peaked at number 5 in Germany, staying on the chart for 5 weeks.

Track listing

Personnel
Adapted from the liner notes of the album.
The Notwist – all vocals, guitars, bass, drums, percussion, keyboards, electronics, record player, pedals, etc.
 Markus Acher
 Micha Acher – brass- and stringarangements
 Cico Beck
Max Punktezahl – guitar
Karl Ivar Refseth – vibraphone, percussion 
Andi Haberl – drums
Theresa Loibl – clarinet, bass clarinet 
Ulrich Wangenheim – alto flute, clarinet, bass clarinet 
Mathias Götz –trombone 
Fabian Striffler – violin
Saya - vocals on "ship", harmony and chorus vocals on "Into love/Stars"
Angel Bat David – clarinet and vocals on "Into the Ice Age"
Ben LaMar Gay – vocals on "Oh Sweet Fire"
Juana Molina – vocals, keyboards, and electronics on "Al Sur"
Zayaendo on "Into Love Again"
Saya – vocals, melodica
Satomi Endo – soprano saxophone
Kiyokazu Onozaki – melodica 
Kiriko Kawamatsu – trombone 
Kanako Ueda – clarinet 
Ken Manabe – tenor saxophone 
Yutaka Hirose – tuba
Tomoaki Saito – mandolin 
Takashi Ueno – banjo 
Mitsuru Tanaka – percussion

Charts

References

External links
 
 

2021 albums
The Notwist albums